Admiral Sir (Thomas Henry) Martyn Jerram,  (6 September 1858 – 19 March 1933) was a Royal Navy officer who went on to be Commander-in-Chief, China Station.

Naval career
Jerram was educated at Woodcote House School. He joined the Royal Navy in 1871.
He commanded a Battalion of the Naval Brigade on an expedition to Kenya in 1890. He was then Acting Vice Consul at Beira and Mpanda in Portuguese East Africa during the unrest in 1891. He went on to command the ships HMS Northampton and HMS Curacoa. From September 1899 to March 1902 he was in command of the training ship HMS Boscawen, stationed at Portland Harbour. In March 1902 he was appointed flag captain of HMS Albion, second flagship on the China Station. He later commanded HMS Russell.

He joined the staff of the Commander of the 3rd Division of the Home Fleet in 1909 and commanded the White Fleet on manoeuvres later that year. The following year he took command of the 4th Division Battleships and then became Second-in-Command of the Mediterranean Fleet.

He served in World War I as Commander-in-Chief, China Station from 1913 to 1915, where he was involved in the 1915 Singapore mutiny before being made Commander of the 2nd Battle Squadron in which capacity he took part in the Battle of Jutland in 1916. Admiral Lord Beatty was subsequently critical of Jerram's role complaining that Jerram failed to support him as darkness fell. He retired in 1917.

Family
In 1892 he married Clara Isabel Parsons, but had remarried Ann J before 1901, when he lived at Portland. He had two sons:
 Roy Martyn Jerram, b. 1895
 Nigel Martyn Jerram, b. at Weymouth 9 March 1900

Legacy
Mount Jerram in the Canadian Rockies was named for him in 1922.

References

1858 births
1933 deaths
Royal Navy admirals of World War I
Knights Grand Cross of the Order of St Michael and St George
Knights Commander of the Order of the Bath
Military personnel from Surrey
People educated at Woodcote House School